In mathematical logic, a Gödel numbering is a function that assigns to each symbol and well-formed formula of some formal language a unique natural number, called its Gödel number. The concept was developed by Kurt Gödel for the proof of his incompleteness theorems.

A Gödel numbering can be interpreted as an encoding in which a number is assigned to each symbol of a mathematical notation, after which a sequence of natural numbers can then represent a sequence of symbols. These sequences of natural numbers can again be represented by single natural numbers, facilitating their manipulation in formal theories of arithmetic.

Since the publishing of Gödel's paper in 1931, the term "Gödel numbering" or "Gödel code" has been used to refer to more general assignments of natural numbers to mathematical objects.

Simplified overview 
Gödel noted that each statement within a system can be represented by a natural number (its Gödel number). The significance of this was that properties of a statement – such as its truth or falsehood – would be equivalent to determining whether its Gödel number had certain properties. The numbers involved might be very large indeed, but this is not a barrier; all that matters is that such numbers can be constructed.

In simple terms, he devised a method by which every formula or statement that can be formulated in the system gets a unique number, in such a way that formulas and Gödel numbers can be mechanically converted back and forth. There are many ways this can be done. A simple example is the way in which English is stored as a sequence of numbers in computers using ASCII. Since ASCII codes are in the range 0 to 127, it is sufficient to pad them to 3 decimal digits and then to concatenate them:

Gödel's encoding 

Gödel used a system based on prime factorization. He first assigned a unique natural number to each basic symbol in the formal language of arithmetic with which he was dealing.

To encode an entire formula, which is a sequence of symbols, Gödel used the following system. Given a sequence  of positive integers, the Gödel encoding of the sequence is the product of the first n primes raised to their corresponding values in the sequence:

According to the fundamental theorem of arithmetic, any number (and, in particular, a number obtained in this way) can be uniquely factored into prime factors, so it is possible to recover the original sequence from its Gödel number (for any given number n of symbols to be encoded).

Gödel specifically used this scheme at two levels: first, to encode sequences of symbols representing formulas, and second, to encode sequences of formulas representing proofs. This allowed him to show a correspondence between statements about natural numbers and statements about the provability of theorems about natural numbers, the key observation of the proof.

There are more sophisticated (and more concise) ways to construct a Gödel numbering for sequences.

Example 

In the specific Gödel numbering used by  Nagel and Newman, the Gödel number for the symbol "0" is 6 and the Gödel number for the symbol "=" is 5. Thus, in their system, the Gödel number of the formula "0 = 0" is 26 × 35 × 56 = 243,000,000.

Lack of uniqueness 

Infinitely many different Gödel numberings are possible. For example, supposing there are K basic symbols, an alternative Gödel numbering could be constructed by invertibly mapping this set of symbols (through, say, an invertible function h) to the set of digits of a bijective base-K numeral system. A formula consisting of a string of n symbols  would then be mapped to the number

In other words, by placing the set of K basic symbols in some fixed order, such that the -th symbol corresponds uniquely to the -th digit of a bijective base-K numeral system, each formula may serve just as the very numeral of its own Gödel number.

For example, the numbering described here has K=1000.

Application to formal arithmetic

Recursion

One may use Gödel numbering to show how functions defined by course-of-values recursion are in fact primitive recursive functions.

Expressing statements and proofs by numbers

Once a Gödel numbering for a formal theory is established, each inference rule of the theory can be expressed as a function on the natural numbers. If f is the Gödel mapping and r is an inference rule, then there should be some arithmetical function gr of natural numbers such that if formula C is derived from formulas A and B through an inference rule r, i.e.

then

This is true for the numbering Gödel used, and for any other numbering where the encoded formula can be arithmetically recovered from its Gödel number.

Thus, in a formal theory such as Peano arithmetic in which one can make statements about numbers and their arithmetical relationships to each other, one can use a Gödel numbering to indirectly make statements about the theory itself. This technique allowed Gödel to prove results about the consistency and completeness properties of formal systems.

Generalizations 

In computability theory, the term "Gödel numbering" is used in settings more general than the one described above. It can refer to:
Any assignment of the elements of a formal language to natural numbers in such a way that the numbers can be manipulated by an algorithm to simulate manipulation of elements of the formal language.
More generally, an assignment of elements from a countable mathematical object, such as a countable group, to natural numbers to allow algorithmic manipulation of the mathematical object.

Also, the term Gödel numbering is sometimes used when the assigned "numbers" are actually strings, which is necessary when considering models of computation such as Turing machines that manipulate strings rather than numbers.

Gödel  sets
Gödel  sets are sometimes used in set theory to encode formulas, and are similar to Gödel  numbers, except that one uses sets rather than numbers to do the encoding. In simple cases when one uses a hereditarily finite set to encode formulas this is essentially equivalent to the use of Gödel numbers, but somewhat easier to define because the tree structure of formulas can be modeled by the tree structure of sets.  Gödel  sets can also be used to encode formulas in infinitary languages.

See also 
 Church encoding
 Description number
 Gödel numbering for sequences
 Gödel's incompleteness theorems
 Chaitin's incompleteness theorem

References 

 .
Gödel's Proof by Ernest Nagel and James R. Newman (1959). This book provides a good introduction and summary of the proof, with a large section dedicated to Gödel's numbering.

Further reading 
 Gödel, Escher, Bach: an Eternal Golden Braid, by Douglas Hofstadter. This book defines and uses an alternative Gödel numbering.
I Am a Strange Loop by Douglas Hofstadter. This is a newer book by Hofstadter that includes the history of Gödel's numbering.
 Visualizing the Turing Tarpit by Jason Hemann and Eric Holk. Uses Gödel numbering to encode programs.

Mathematical logic
Theory of computation
Numbering